Visithiran is a 2022 Indian Tamil-language police procedural film directed by M. Padmakumar starring R. K. Suresh and Poorna. It is a remake of the director's own Malayalam film Joseph (2018).

The film was scheduled to release on 20 May 2022 but ended up releasing earlier on 6 May.

Cast 

R. K. Suresh as Maayan
Poorna as Stella
Madhu Shalini as Meenakshi
Bagavathi Perumal as Peter
Ilavarasu 
George Maryan
Anil Murali as Police officer
G. Marimuthu
 Ravi Venkatraman
Pondy Ravi as Police officer
Sudha Chandran as Advocate Srinithi
Sangeetha V as Doctor
Ganeshkar as Driver

Production
Director Bala decided to produce the remake of Malayalam film Joseph under his banner with actor R. K. Suresh reprising the role of Joju George. John Mahendran was signed to write the dialogues for the original script of Shahi Kabir. Suresh increased his weight by 22 kilos and later had to shed weight for his young appearance, moreover, Suresh had to give three different voices in the dubbing for the film. Poorna and Madhu Shalini were signed to play the roles of Athmiya Rajan and Madhuri Braganza respectively. Malayalam actor Anil Murali reprised the same role in the original.

Soundtrack 
The music is composed by G. V. Prakash Kumar.
"Aararo" - Nakkhul
"Deva Emmai" - Yazin Nizar
"Kaanaadha Deepam" - Arjun Muralidharan, Sindoori Vishal, Padmalatha
"Kanne Kanne" - Roshan Sebastian	
"Ooduthe Ovvovuru Naalum" - Harihara Sudhan

Reception 
Logesh Balachandran of The Times of India opined that "Overall, Vichithiran might appeal an audience that is on the lookout for an engaging emotional thriller as their weekend watch". Vignesh Madhu of Cinema Express stated that "With a lot going for it, especially RK Suresh's performance and the earnestness in storytelling, Visithiran is definitely one of the better remakes to come our way hitting not only the same highs of the original but resorting to similar lows". A critic from Behindwoods said that "Visithiran which is an official remake of the Malayalam superhit stays true to the original thanks largely to the captain of the ship M. Padmakumar". A critic from Maalai Malar Noted that "Through the screenplay, the director has shown how human lives are affected by the industries around medicine. They have made the film in the style of organ theft emotional thriller. He has skillfully worked among the characters.".Critic from Dinamalar gave 2.75 rating out of 5

References

External links
 

Indian thriller films
Films directed by M. Padmakumar
Tamil remakes of Malayalam films
Films scored by G. V. Prakash Kumar